Vladimir Nikolaevich Novikov (Novgorod Governorate,  – Moscow, 21 July 2000) was a Soviet-Russian statesman was Chairman of the State Planning Committee from 1960 to 1962 and Chairman of the Supreme Soviet of the National Economy from 1962 to 1965.

 Указ Президиума Верховного Совета СССР Указ Президиума Верховного Совета СССР «О присвоении звания Героя Социалистического Труда товарищам Быховскому А. И., Ванникову Б. Л., Гонор Л. Р., Еляну А. С., Новикову и Устинову Д. Ф.» от 3 июня 1942 года // Ведомости Верховного Совета Союза Советских Социалистических Республик : газета. — 1942. — 15 июня (№ 22 (181)). — С. 1.

1907 births
2000 deaths
People from Novgorod Oblast
Central Committee of the Communist Party of the Soviet Union members
Russian communists
Burials in Troyekurovskoye Cemetery